The Kärpf (or Chärpf) is a mountain in the Glarus Alps, at an elevation of . The Kärpf is the highest point of the massif lying north of Richetli Pass. This range separates the two main valleys of Glarus: the main Linth valley with the village of Linthal on the west and the Sernftal with the village of Elm on the east.

On the north side of the Kärpf is located a small valley, which is occupied by a lake, the Garichtisee.

Administratively, the mountain lies in the municipality of Glarus Süd, in the canton of Glarus.

References

External links
 
 Kärpf on Hikr

Mountains of the Alps
Mountains of Switzerland
Mountains of the canton of Glarus
Two-thousanders of Switzerland